Ibrahim "Ibou" Ba (born 12 January 1973) is a French former professional footballer who played as a right midfielder. Starting off his career with Le Havre in France in the early 1990s, he went on to represent clubs in Italy, England, Turkey, and Sweden before retiring at A.C. Milan in 2008. A full international between 1997 and 1998, he won eight caps for the France national team and scored two goals.

Career

Early career
Born in Senegal's capital, Dakar, Ibrahim Ngom Ba was not yet eighteen when, in 1991, he started playing for the French club Le Havre AC, where he spent five years. In 1996, he moved to fellow Ligue 1 outfit Bordeaux, reaching the final of the Coupe de la Ligue.

A.C. Milan
In 1997, Ba transferred from FC Girondins de Bordeaux to Milan, and in 1998–99 he won the Serie A title.

He was later loaned to AC Perugia, where he suffered a knee injury. He underwent another loan, with Olympique de Marseille, in 2001. Back in Milan, Ba won both the UEFA Champions League and the Coppa Italia during the team's highly successful 2002–03 season, although he was never a starter, making only 5 appearances in all competitions across the season.

Bolton Wanderers
In 2003, he left Milan and joined Bolton Wanderers in England. He helped them reach the 2004 Football League Cup Final, playing in both legs of the semi-final victory over Aston Villa. However, he was left out of the match day squad as they lost the final to Middlesbrough. Ba made his last appearance for Bolton against Chelsea on 13 March 2004.

Çaykur Rizespor 
He failed to make an impression at Bolton, and moved on to Turkey after just one season, joining Çaykur Rizespor on a one-year deal on 24 August 2004.

Djurgårdens IF 
On 6 February 2005, Ba was signed by Swedish side Djurgårdens IF on a two-year contract. Djurgården won both Allsvenskan and Svenska Cupen in his first season with the club. In early 2006, it was decided that his contract would be terminated and he subsequently left Djurgården in January of that year, having played in 14 games and scored one goal.

Return to A.C. Milan
At the start of 2007 Ba returned to Italy to train with Serie C2 team Varese to help with his fitness. In June 2007, after traveling to Athens together with the A.C. Milan squad to attend the UEFA Champions League final in which they defeated English Premier League side Liverpool, Ba agreed to a one-year contract with Milan.

At the conclusion of the 2007–08 season, in which he made only one appearance in the Coppa Italia as a substitute on the bench, he retired from the game as a player and became a scout for Milan in Africa.

International career 
Ba won eight caps for the France national team between 1997 and 1998, and scored two goals. His two goals came in friendlies against Portugal and South Africa.

Career statistics

International 

Scores and results list France's goal tally first, score column indicates score after each Ba goal.

Personal life
Ibrahim Ba is the son of 1970s Senegalese international footballer Ibrahima Ba (born 1951), who spent his late career in France, where he helped Le Havre AC to promotion in 1979 and finished his career at SC Abbeville. Ibrahima Ba's younger son, Fabien (born 22 October 1994) is also a footballer, playing in Italy with the Giovanissimi Nazionali of his brother Ibrahim's former club A.C. Milan.

In 2018, Paolo Maldini named Ba one of his close friends from the world of football.

Honours

Club 
AC Milan
 Serie A: 1998–99
 UEFA Champions League: 2002–03
 Coppa Italia: 2002–03

Djurgårdens IF
 Allsvenskan: 2005
Svenska Cupen: 2005

References

External links
 
 
 

Living people
1973 births
Footballers from Dakar
Association football wingers
French footballers
France international footballers
Ligue 1 players
Le Havre AC players
FC Girondins de Bordeaux players
A.C. Milan players
A.C. Perugia Calcio players
Olympique de Marseille players
Bolton Wanderers F.C. players
Djurgårdens IF Fotboll players
Çaykur Rizespor footballers
French sportspeople of Senegalese descent
Serie A players
Allsvenskan players
Premier League players
French expatriate sportspeople in England
Süper Lig players
French expatriate footballers
Expatriate footballers in Italy
Expatriate footballers in England
French expatriate sportspeople in Turkey
Expatriate footballers in Sweden
Expatriate footballers in Turkey
Fula people
French expatriate sportspeople in Italy
French expatriate sportspeople in Sweden